Shangdi, also written simply, "Emperor", is the Chinese term for "Supreme Deity" or  "Highest Deity" in the theology of the classical texts, especially deriving from Shang theology and finding an equivalent in the later Tian ("Heaven" or "Great Whole") of Zhou theology.

Although in Chinese religion the usage of "Tian" to refer to the absolute God of the universe is predominant, "Shangdi" continues to be used in a variety of traditions, including certain philosophical schools, certain strains of Confucianism, some Chinese salvationist religions (notably Yiguandao) and Chinese Protestant Christianity. In addition, it is common to use such term among contemporary Chinese (both mainland and overseas) and East Asian religious and secular societies, typically for a singular universal deity and a non-religion translation for God in Abrahamic religions.

Etymology 

"Shang Di" is the pinyin romanization of two Chinese characters. The first  , Shàng  means "high", "highest", "first", "primordial"; the second  , Dì  is typically considered as shorthand for huangdi in modern Chinese, the title of the emperors of China first employed by Qin Shi Huang, and is usually translated as "emperor". The word itself is derived from Three "Huang" and Five "Di", including Yellow Emperor (Huangdi ), the mythological originator of the Chinese civilization and the ancestor of the Chinese race. However,  refers to the High God of Shang, thus means "deity" (manifested god), . Thus, the name Shangdi should be translated as "Highest Deity", but also has the implied meaning of "Primordial Deity" or "First Deity" in Classical Chinese. The deity preceded the title and the emperors of China were named after him in their role as Tianzi, the sons of Heaven. In the classical texts the highest conception of the heavens is frequently identified with Shang Di, who is described somewhat anthropomorphically. He is also associated with the pole star. The conceptions of the Supreme Ruler (Shang Di) and of the Sublime Heavens (Huang-t'ien) afterward coalesce or absorb each other.

History

Shang dynasty

The earliest references to Shangdi are found in oracle bone inscriptions of the Shang Dynasty in the 2nd millennium BC, although the later work Classic of History claims yearly sacrifices were made to him by Emperor Shun, even before the Xia Dynasty.

Shangdi was regarded as the ultimate spiritual power by the ruling elite of the Huaxia during the Shang dynasty: he was believed to control victory in battle, success or failure of harvests, weather conditions such as the floods of the Yellow River, and the fate of the kingdom. Shangdi seems to have ruled a hierarchy of other gods controlling nature, as well as the spirits of the deceased. These ideas were later mirrored or carried on by the Taoist Jade Emperor and his celestial bureaucracy.

Shangdi was probably more transcendent than immanent, only working through lesser gods. Shangdi was considered too distant to be worshiped directly by ordinary mortals. Instead, the Shang kings proclaimed that Shangdi had made himself accessible through the souls of their royal ancestors, both in the legendary past and in recent generations as the departed Shang kings joined him in the afterlife. The emperors could thus successfully entreat Shangdi directly. Many of the oracle bone inscriptions record these petitions, usually praying for rain but also seeking approval from Shangdi for state action.

Zhou dynasty 
In the later Shang and Zhou dynasties, Shangdi was conflated with Heaven (Tiān). The Duke of Zhou justified his clan's usurpation through the concept of the Mandate of Heaven, which proposed that the protection of Shangdi was not connected to their clan membership but by their just governance. Shangdi was not just a tribal but instead an unambiguously good moral force, exercising its power according to exacting standards. Shangdi's favor could thus be lost and even "inherited" by a new dynasty, provided they upheld the proper rituals.

Nonetheless, the connection of many rituals with the Shang clan meant that Shang nobles continued to rule several locations (despite their rebellions) and to serve as court advisors and priests. The Duke of Zhou even created an entire ceremonial city along strict cosmological principles to house the Shang aristocracy and the nine tripods representing Huaxia sovereignty; the Shang were then charged with maintaining the Rites of Zhou. Likewise, the Shang's lesser houses, the shi knightly class, developed directly into the learned Confucian gentry and scholars who advised the Zhou rulers on courtly etiquette and ceremony. The Confucian classics carried on and ordered the earlier traditions, including the worship of Shangdi. All of them include references:

The Four Books mention Shangdi as well but, as it is a later compilation, the references are much more sparse and abstract. Shangdi appears most commonly in earlier works: this pattern may reflect increasing rationalization of Shangdi over time, the shift from a known and arbitrary tribal god to a more abstract and philosophical concept, or his conflation and absorption by other deities.

Han dynasty
By the time of the Han dynasty, the influential Confucian scholar Zheng Xuan glossed: "Shangdi is another name for Heaven". Dong Zhongshu said: "Heaven is the ultimate authority, the king of gods who should be admired by the king".

In later eras, he was commonly known by the name "Heavenly Ruling Highest Deity" (Huángtiān Shàngdì) and, in this usage, he is especially conflated with the Taoist Jade Emperor.

Identification

The Shang progenitor
In Shang sources, Di is already described as the supreme ordainer of the events which occur in nature, such as wind, lightning and thunder, and in human affairs and politics. All the gods of nature are conceived as his envoys or manifestations. Shang sources also attest his cosmological Five Ministries. Di, or Tian, as later texts explain, did not receive cult for being too remote for living humans to sacrifice to directly. Instead, an intermediary such as an ancestor was necessary to convey to Di the offerings of the living.

According to some prominent scholars, including Guo Moruo, Shangdi was originally identical to Ku (or Kui) or Diku ("Divus Ku"), the progenitor (first ancestor) of the Zi lineage, the founders of the Shang dynasty, attested in the Shiji and other texts. According to this interpretation, this identification had profound political implications, because it meant that the earthly Shang kings were themselves by birth aspects of divinity.

Further evidence from Shang sources suggests that there wasn't a complete identification between the two, as Di controls spirits of nature, while Kui does not; Di is frequently pictured sending down "approvals", while Kui is never so pictured; and Kui received cult, while Di did not. Moreover, Kui is frequently appealed in "horizontal" relationship with other powers, undermining any portrait of him as the apex of the pantheon.

Shangdi as the celestial pole
David Pankenier has studied the astral connections of Shangdi, drawing on a view that interest in the sky was a focal character of the religious practices of the Shang, but also of the earlier Xia and Erlitou cultures. Especially intriguing is the fact that palatial and ceremonial structures of these cultures were carefully aligned to the celestial pole and the procession of pole stars. Pankenier notes that the true celestial pole lies in a sky template which is vacant of significant stars, and that the various pole stars are those nearest to this vacant apex which is of crucial importance.

He illustrates how the Shang oracular script for Di can be projected on the north pole template of the ancient sky in such a way that its extremity points correspond with the visible star, while the intersection of the linear axes at the centre will map to the vacant celestial pole. Pankenier argues that the supreme Di was identified with the celestial pole, an idea familiar in later stages of Chinese religion, linking with the Tàiyī 太一 ("Great One") fully documented as early as the 4th century BC.

The interpretation of Shangdi as the celestial pole, Taiyi and as Ku the progenitor of the Shang is not contradictory. Feng Shi argues that Ku and Di are indeed identical. The Shang probably deliberately identified their ancestor with a universal god recognized in different regions and local cultures in order to legitimize their power.

Contemporary Confucianism
Contemporary Confucian theologians have emphasised differences between the Confucian idea of Shangdi, conceived as both transcendent and immanent, and act only as a governor of the world, and the Christian idea of God, which they conceived contrary to those of Christian as a deity that is completely otherworldly (transcendent) and is merely a creator of the world.

Worship 

As mentioned above, sacrifices offered to Shangdi by the king are claimed by traditional Chinese histories to predate the Xia dynasty. The surviving archaeological record shows that by the Shang, the shoulder blades of sacrificed oxen were used to send questions or communication through fire and smoke to the divine realm, a practice known as scapulimancy. The heat would cause the bones to crack and royal diviners would interpret the marks as Shangdi's response to the king. Inscriptions used for divination were buried into special orderly pits, while those that were for practice or records were buried in common middens after use.

Under Shangdi or his later names, the deity received sacrifices from the ruler of China in every Chinese dynasty annually at a great Temple of Heaven in the imperial capital. Following the principles of Chinese geomancy, this would always be located in the southern quarter of the city. During the ritual, a completely healthy bull would be slaughtered and presented as an animal sacrifice to Shangdi. The Book of Rites states the sacrifice should occur on the "longest day" on a round-mound altar. The altar would have three tiers: the highest for Shangdi and the Son of Heaven; the second-highest for the sun and moon; and the lowest for the natural gods such as the stars, clouds, rain, wind, and thunder.

It is important to note that Shangdi is never represented with either images or idols. Instead, in the center building of the Temple of Heaven, in a structure called the "Imperial Vault of Heaven", a "spirit tablet" (shénwèi) inscribed with the name of Shangdi is stored on the throne, Huangtian Shangdi. During an annual sacrifice, the emperor would carry these tablets to the north part of the Temple of Heaven, a place called the "Prayer Hall For Good Harvests", and place them on that throne.

Conflation with singular universal God

It was during Ming and Qing dynasty, when Roman Catholicism was introduced by Jesuit Priest Matteo Ricci, that the idea of "Shangdi" started to be applied to the Christian conception of God.

While initially he utilized the term Tianzhu, lit. "The Lord of Heaven", Ricci gradually changed the translation into "Shangdi" instead. His usage of Shangdi was contested by Confucians, as they believed that the concept of Tian and "Shangdi" is different from that of Christianity's God: Zhōng Shǐ-shēng, through his books, stated that Shangdi only governs, while Christianity's God is a creator, and thus they differ. Ricci's translation also invited the displeasure of Dominicans and that of the Roman Curia: on March 19, 1715, Pope Clement XI released the Edict Ex Illa Die, stating that Catholics must use "Tianzhu" instead of "Shangdi" for Christianity's God.

When Protestantism entered China in the middle of the 19th century, the Protestant missionaries also encountered a similar issue: some preferred the term "Shangdi", while some preferred the term Shen ("god"). A conference held in 1877 in Shanghai, discussing the translation-issue, also believed that "Shangdi" of Confucianism and the Christian concept of God are different in nature.

Catholics preferred to avoid it, due to compromises with the local authority in order to do their missions, as well as fear such translation may associate the Christian God to Chinese polytheism.

Nowadays, through the secular Chinese-language media, the Chinese word of "Shangdi" and "Tian" are frequently used to as a translation for the singular universal deity with minimal religious attachment to the Christian idea of God, while Confucians and intellectuals in contemporary mainland China and Taiwan attempt to realign the term to its original meaning. Catholics officially use the term Tianzhu, while Evangelicals typically use Shangdi and/or Shen ("god" or "spirit").

See also
Jade Emperor
Yuanshi Tianzun
Taiyi Tianzun
Hongjun Laozu
Tian
Tao
Chinese folk religion
Chinese mythology
Shen

In other culture and beliefs
Śakra (in Buddhism)
Haneullim (in Korea)
Amenominakanushi (in Japan)
Tengri (in Mongolia)
Indra (in Hinduism)
Ông Trời (in Vietnam)
 Allah
 Brahma
 Ishvara

Notes

References

Citations

Sources 

 
 
 
 Creel, Herrlee G., The Origins of Statecraft in China. 
 Wu, K. C. (1982). The Chinese Heritage. New York: Crown Publishers. .

External links 
 

Chinese gods
God
Names of God
Deities in Chinese folk religion
Sky and weather gods
Supernatural beings identified with Christian saints
Religious Confucianism